A governor in Pakistan is the appointed head of state of a province, appointed by the President of Pakistan on the advice of the Prime Minister.  Articles 101 to 105 of the Constitution of Pakistan deal with the appointment, conditions, and duties of a governor.

A governor should be eligible to be elected as a member of the National Assembly of Pakistan, and should be at least 35 years old. They should also be a registered voter of the concerned province, and should not hold any office of profit. The Chief Justice of the concerned province's High Court administers the oath of office, after which the governor is not eligible for the election as a member of the Parliament of Pakistan and the Provincial Assemblies as long as they are in office.

In case of a governor's absence, the Speaker of the Provincial Assembly becomes the acting governor of the province.

Current governors in Pakistan 
The table below lists the currently-serving governors of Pakistan as of January 2023.

Heads of administrative territories

See also
 List of presidents of Pakistan
 Chief Secretary (Pakistan)
 List of current Pakistani chief ministers

References

Governors
Governors of Pakistani provinces